The men's lightweight (60 kg/132 lbs) Full-Contact category at the W.A.K.O. World Championships 2007 in Coimbra was the fourth lightest of the male Full-Contact tournaments, involving twelve fighters from three continents (Europe, Asia and Africa).  Each of the matches was three rounds of two minutes each and were fought under Full-Contact rules.   

Because there were not enough men for a tournament designed for sixteen, four fighters had byes through to the quarter final stage.  The tournament final was a repeat of the Low Kick final held a month or so earlier in Belgrade, with Russian Zurab Faroyan once again defeating Azerbaijani opponent Eduard Mammadov by split decision to claim the gold.  Defeated semi finalists, Kornel Sandor from Hungary and Daniel Martins from France, won bronze medals.

Results

Key

See also
List of WAKO Amateur World Championships
List of WAKO Amateur European Championships
List of male kickboxers

References

External links
 WAKO World Association of Kickboxing Organizations Official Site

Kickboxing events at the WAKO World Championships 2007 Coimbra
2007 in kickboxing
Kickboxing in Portugal